Bosch-Boonstra-Schaaf optic atrophy syndrome is a rare autosomally inherited condition characterised by developmental delay, intellectual disability and decreased visual acuity.

Presentation

All patients described have suffered from developmental delay, intellectual disability (intelligence quotient range 48-74) and decreased visual acuity. Ocular abnormalities include small discs, pale discs, disc excavation, strabismus and latent nystagmus.

Other features of this condition are somewhat variable and include:
 Facial indicators
 Protruding ears
 Helical anomalies
 Small nasal ridge
 High nasal bridge
 Upturned nose
 Epicanthal folds
 Upslanting palpebral fissures
 Skeletal indicators
 Tapering fingers
 Hypotonia

Genetics

This condition is caused by mutations in the NR2F1 gene. This gene is located on the long arm of chromosome 5 (5q15) and encodes a protein that acts as a nuclear receptor and transcriptional regulator. The syndrome is inherited in an autosomal dominant fashion.

Management

There is no curative treatment known at present for his condition. Management is supportive.

Epidemiology

This condition is considered to be rare with fewer than 50 cases described in the modern literature.

History

This condition was first described in 2014.

References

External links 

Congenital disorders
Rare diseases
Syndromes
Autosomal dominant disorders